Bwenelang (Mbwenelang) (also known as Xoli) is an Oceanic language spoken on Malekula, Vanuatu.

References

https://abvd.shh.mpg.de/austronesian/language.php?id=1316

Malekula languages
Languages of Vanuatu